Loving Couples can refer to:

 Loving Couples (1964 film), a 1964 Swedish film
 Loving Couples (1980 film), a 1980 American film